Šratovci is a village on the right bank of the Mura River in the Municipality of Radenci in northeastern Slovenia, close to the border with Austria.

References

External links
Šratovci on Geopedia

Populated places in the Municipality of Radenci